Plateaux is a department of Haut-Ogooué Province in south-eastern Gabon. The capital lies at Lekoni. It had a population of 9,054 in 2013.

Towns and villages

References

Haut-Ogooué Province
Departments of Gabon